Rumbling Bridge railway station served the village of Rumbling Bridge, Kinross-shire, Scotland from 1863 to 1964 on the Devon Valley Railway.

History 
The station opened on 1 May 1863 by the Devon Valley Railway. It opened as a terminus until the line to the east was completed. It closed on 1 October 1868 but was later relocated to the west and reopened on 1 October 1870. To the west was the goods yard and to the south was the signal box. The station closed to both passengers and goods traffic on 15 June 1964.

References

External links 

Railway stations in Great Britain opened in 1863
Railway stations in Great Britain closed in 1868
Railway stations in Great Britain opened in 1870
Railway stations in Great Britain closed in 1964
Beeching closures in Scotland
1863 establishments in Scotland
1964 disestablishments in Scotland